The anime series television Bungo Stray Dogs focuses on individuals who are gifted with supernatural powers and use them for different purposes including holding a business, solving mysteries, and carrying out missions assigned by the mafia. The story mainly follows the members of the "Armed Detective Agency" and their everyday lives. It is produced by Bones was directed by Takuya Igarashi and written by Yōji Enokido.  Nobuhiro Arai and Hiroshi Kanno served as the chief animation directors, while the former also served as character designer along with Ryō Hirata.  

Taku Iwasaki composed the series' music.  Kazuhiro Wakabayashi was the series' sound director at Glovision.  Additionally, Yumiko Kondou was the art director, Yukari Goto was the anime's colour designer, Tsuyoshi Kanbayashi was the director of photography, and Shigeru Nishiyama was the editor. Granrodeo performed the anime's opening theme, titled "Trash Candy", and Luck Life  performed the anime's ending theme, titled . The two seasons were released on DVD and Blu-ray between June 24, 2016 and August 4, 2017. Funimation licensed the series for English release, with the first compilation being out on March 6, 2018

The series was split into two halves: the first half, containing twelve episodes, premiered on 7 April 2016 and ended on 23 June 2016, being broadcast on Tokyo MX, Teletama, Chiba TV, tvk, GBS (Gifu Broadcasting), Mie TV, SUN, TVQ Kyushu, and BS11.  The second half, also containing twelve episodes, premiered on 6 October 2016 and ended on 22 December 2016. The series has been licensed for streaming by Crunchyroll. Screen Mode sung the opening theme titled "Reason Living" while Luck Life once again sung the ending theme titled .

An original video animation was bundled with the 13th limited edition manga volume, which was released on 31 August 2017.

On 21 July 2018, it was announced that the series would receive a third season. The voice cast and staff reprised their roles from the past two seasons. The third season premiered from 12 April 2019 and ended on 28 June 2019, broadcast on Tokyo MX, TVA, KBS, SUN, BS11, and Wowow. Granrodeo performed the third seasons' opening theme , and Luck Life performed the third seasons' ending theme "Lily."

A fourth anime season was announced on 7 November 2021. It premiered on 4 January 2023. Screen Mode performed the opening theme "True Story", and Luck Life performed the ending theme .

The anime is licensed in North America by Crunchyroll (with home media distribution from Funimation) and in the United Kingdom by Anime Limited.

Series overview

Episode list

Bungo Stray Dogs

Season 1 (2016)

Season 2 (2016)

Season 3 (2019)

Season 4 (2023)

Bungo Stray Dogs Wan!

Home media releases

Japan

Season 1

Season 2

Season 3

North America

Australia

Notes

References

Bungo Stray Dogs